"Witt's theorem" or "the Witt theorem" may also refer to the Bourbaki–Witt fixed point theorem of order theory.

In mathematics, Witt's theorem, named after Ernst Witt, is a basic result in the algebraic theory of quadratic forms:  any isometry between two subspaces of a nonsingular quadratic space over a field k may be extended to an isometry of the whole space.  An analogous statement holds also for skew-symmetric, Hermitian and skew-Hermitian bilinear forms over arbitrary fields. The theorem applies to classification of quadratic forms over k and in particular allows one to define the Witt group W(k) which describes the "stable" theory of quadratic forms over the field k.

Statement 

Let  be a finite-dimensional vector space over a field k of characteristic different from 2 together with a non-degenerate symmetric or skew-symmetric bilinear form. If {{nowrap|f : U → ''U}} is an isometry between two subspaces of V then f extends to an isometry of V.

This fact plays an important role in the structure theory and representation theory of the isometry group and in the theory of reductive dual pairs.

 Witt's cancellation theorem 

Assume that

 

 

In other words, the direct summand  appearing in both sides  of an isomorphism between quadratic spaces may be "cancelled".

 Witt's decomposition theorem 

Let  be a quadratic space over a field k. Then
it admits a Witt decomposition:

 

Quadratic forms with the same core form are said to be similar or Witt equivalent'''.

Citations

References 
 Emil Artin (1957) Geometric Algebra, page 121 via Internet Archive
 
 
 

Theorems in linear algebra
Quadratic forms